The 2018 United States House of Representatives elections in Pennsylvania were held on November 6, 2018, to elect the 18 U.S. representatives from the Commonwealth of Pennsylvania, one from each of the state's 18 congressional districts.

The elections coincided with the 2018 gubernatorial election, as well as other elections to the House of Representatives, elections to the United States Senate and various state and local elections.

In January 2018, the Pennsylvania Supreme Court struck down the state's congressional map, ruling it had been unfairly gerrymandered to favor Republicans. New maps were subsequently adopted in February 2018.

The 2018 general election saw the Democrats gain four seats and the Republicans gain one seat, for a Democratic net gain of three seats, changing the state's representation from 12 to 6 Republican to a 9–9 tie. In addition, Pennsylvanians in several districts elected female candidates to the U.S. House, thus ending four years of all-male Congressional representation in the state.

Redistricting

In January 2018, the Pennsylvania Supreme Court struck down the state's congressional map, ruling it had been unfairly gerrymandered to favor Republicans. New maps were subsequently adopted in February 2018, for use in the 2018 elections and took effect with representation in 2019.

Results summary

Statewide

District
Results of the 2018 United States House of Representatives elections in Pennsylvania:

District 1

The 1st district previously consisted of central and South Philadelphia, the City of Chester, the Philadelphia International Airport and other small sections of Delaware County. Under the new congressional map that was in place in 2019 (represented per 2018's elections), the first district overlaps with much of the former 8th district, which is represented by Republican Congressman Brian Fitzpatrick. Fitzpatrick took office in 2017, succeeding his brother, former Congressman Mike Fitzpatrick. The new 1st district consists of Bucks County and a small portion of Montgomery County.

Republican primary

Candidates

Nominee
Brian Fitzpatrick, incumbent U.S. Representative

Eliminated in primary
Dean Malik, former Bucks County Assistant District Attorney and candidate for this seat in 2010 & 2016

Withdrawn
Valerie Mihalek, former Yardley Borough council member and deputy district director for former U.S. Rep. Mike Fitzpatrick

Primary results

Democratic primary
The old 8th district was included on the initial list of Republican held seats being targeted by the Democratic Congressional Campaign Committee.

Candidates

Nominee
Scott Wallace, charitable foundation director and grandson of former Vice President Henry Wallace

Eliminated in primary
Steven Bacher, environmentalist
Rachel Reddick, former Navy prosecutor

Declined
Diane Ellis-Marseglia, Bucks County commissioner

Campaign
The race featured a number of negative ads between Reddick and Wallace. With Reddick's campaign releasing an ad calling Wallace a “Maryland multi-millionaire” and stating that he had case an absentee ballot cast from his second home in a South African “gated luxury estate”. The Wallace campaign responded with an ad higlishting Reddick flubbing a question about the so-called “global gag rule” during a campaign stop in Ottsville, and for her having been registered as a Republican for most of her adult life.

Many DC Democrats expressed excitement about Wallace's potential to spend big to defeat Fitzpatrick, especially in the expensive Philadelphia market. He loaned his campaign $2.5 million while Reddick only raised $363,000 and was shunned by most party strategists.

Endorsements

Primary results

General election

Endorsements

Debates
Complete video of debate, October 19, 2018

Polling

Predictions

Results

Analysis
Fitzpatrick held out to win re-election, despite many similar suburban districts held by Republicans falling to Democrats in the 2018 cycle. Fitzpatrick did this by establishing a reputation for himself as an independent centrist who attained endorsements from several usually-left-leaning and nonpartisan groups without enraging the more fervently pro-Trump wing of the Republican party. Analysts considered the Democratic nominee Scott Wallace an unusually weak candidate: he was a wealthy heir who moved to the district, opening up accusations of carpetbagging, and made several gaffes and missteps. Editor Dave Wasserman of the Cook Political Report wrote that Wallace was perhaps the weakest candidate of the 2018 cycle.

District 2

The 2nd district consists of the northern half of Philadelphia. It mostly overlaps with the old 1st District. That district's incumbent, Democrat Bob Brady, had served since 1998, but did not run for reelection. The incumbent of the old 2nd district is Dwight Evans, but Evans opted to follow most of his constituents into the 3rd District.

The new map drew the home of fellow Democrat Brendan Boyle, who has represented the neighboring 13th District since 2015, into the 2nd, leading to speculation that he would run for reelection there. Soon after the new map was released, Boyle confirmed that he would indeed run in the 2nd.

Democratic primary

Candidates

Nominee
Brendan Boyle, incumbent U.S. Representative

Eliminated in primary
Michele Lawrence, former Senior Vice President for Wells Fargo

Declined
Bob Brady, incumbent U.S. Representative

Endorsements

Primary results

Republican primary

Candidates

Nominee
David Torres, community activist

Primary results

General election

Endorsements

Results

District 3

The 3rd district was previously located in Northwestern Pennsylvania, but now covers downtown and northern Philadelphia, and overlaps with much of the previous 2nd district. The incumbent from the 2nd district is Democrat Dwight Evans, who has held office since 2016. Evans defeated incumbent Democratic representative Chaka Fattah in the 2016 Democratic primary, and then went on to be elected with 90% in both the general election and a simultaneous special election for the remainder of the term after Fattah resigned.

Democratic primary

Candidates

Nominee
Dwight Evans, incumbent U.S. Representative

Eliminated in primary
Kevin Johnson

Endorsements

Primary results

Republican primary

Candidates

Nominee
Bryan Leib

Primary results

General election

Endorsements

Results

District 4

The old 4th district was in South Central Pennsylvania, but the new 4th district is centered in Montgomery County. The district overlaps with the former 13th district. The incumbent from this district, Democrat Brendan Boyle, could have sought re-election in either this district or the new 2nd district, which absorbed his home and most of old 13th's share of Philadelphia. Boyle opted to run in the 2nd, making the 4th an open seat.

Democratic primary
State Senator Daylin Leach had announced that he would run for Congress in the old 7th District, but was expected to switch races after his home was drawn into the new 4th. However, on February 24, 2018, Leach succumbed to pressures from fellow Democrats, including Governor Tom Wolf, to abandon his congressional campaign in the face of accusations of sexual harassment. However, he remained in his Pennsylvania Senate seat.

Candidates

Nominee
Madeleine Dean, state representative

Eliminated in primary
Shira Goodman, public policy advocate
Joe Hoeffel, former U.S. Representative, nominee for Senate in 2004 and candidate for Governor in 2010

Withdrawn
Mary Jo Daley, state representative (endorsed Dean)
Daylin Leach, state senator and candidate for the 13th district in 2014

Declined
Allyson Schwartz, former U.S. Representative and candidate for Governor in 2014

Endorsements

Primary results

Republican primary

Candidates

Nominee
Dan David, investor

Primary results

General election

Endorsements

Results

District 5

The old 5th district was in North Central Pennsylvania, but the new 5th district consists of Delaware County, portions of southern Philadelphia, and a sliver of Montgomery County. The district overlaps with much of the old 7th district, whose incumbent Republican Congressman Pat Meehan chose not to seek re-election, due to allegations regarding a sexual harassment complaint that was settled with the use of taxpayer funds,  and subsequently resigned from office in April.

Republican primary

Candidates

Nominee
Pearl Kim, former Deputy Attorney General of Pennsylvania

Withdrawn
Paul Addis

Declined
Pat Meehan, incumbent U.S. Representative

Primary results

Democratic primary

Candidates

Nominee
Mary Gay Scanlon, attorney and former Wallingford-Swarthmore School Board member

Eliminated in primary
Larry Arata, teacher and environmental advocate
Margo L. Davidson, state representative
Thaddeus Kirkland, Mayor of Chester
Richard Lazer, former Deputy Mayor of Philadelphia 
Lindy Li, financial manager and candidate for this seat in 2014
Ashley Lunkenheimer, former assistant U.S. attorney in the Eastern District of Pennsylvania
Molly Sheehan, scientist
Greg Vitali, state representative
Theresa Wright, entrepreneur

Withdrawn
George Badey III, attorney and nominee for this seat in 2012

Endorsements

Polling

Primary results

General election

Endorsements

Predictions

Results

District 6

The 6th district consists of Chester County and Reading. The incumbent is Republican Ryan Costello, who has represented the district since 2015. He was re-elected to a second term with 57% of the vote in 2016. On March 24, 2018, Costello announced that he would no longer seek re-election due to the growing Democratic voter demographic in the 6th district. Costello formally withdrew his name on March 27.

Republican primary

Candidates

Nominee
Greg McCauley

Withdrawn
Ryan Costello, incumbent U.S. Representative

Primary results

Democratic primary

Candidates

Nominee
Chrissy Houlahan, former United States Air Force Captain, engineer and businesswoman

Primary results

General election

Endorsements

Predictions

Results

District 7

The 7th district was formerly centered on Delaware County, but the new district consists of much of the Lehigh Valley. The new 7th district overlaps with much of the former 15th district, which was represented by retired Republican Congressman Charlie Dent who resigned early.

Republican primary

Candidates

Nominee
Marty Nothstein, chairman of the Lehigh County Board of Commissioners

Primary results

Democratic primary

Candidates

Nominee
Susan Wild, former Allentown Solicitor

Eliminated in primary
David Clark
Rick Daugherty, former chair of the Lehigh County Democratic Party and nominee for this seat in 2012 & 2016
Greg Edwards, pastor
John Morganelli, Northampton County District Attorney, candidate for Pennsylvania Attorney General in 2000, 2004 & 2016 and nominee in 2008
Roger Ruggles

Endorsements

Primary results

General election

Endorsements

Polling

Predictions

Results

District 8

The 8th district was previously centered on Bucks County, but now consists of portions of Northeastern Pennsylvania, including the city of Scranton. The new district overlaps with much of the former 17th district, which is represented by Democratic Congressman Matt Cartwright. Cartwright has held office since 2013.

Democratic primary

Candidates

Nominee
Matt Cartwright, incumbent U.S. Representative

Primary results

Republican primary

Candidates

Nominee
John Chrin, businessman

Eliminated in primary
Robert Kuniegel
Joe Peters

Primary results

General election

Endorsements

Polling

Predictions

Results

District 9

The old 9th district was in South Central Pennsylvania, but the new 9th district is in east central Pennsylvania. The new district overlaps with the old 11th district, which was represented by retiring Republican Congressman Lou Barletta.

Republican primary

Candidates

Nominee
Dan Meuser, former Secretary of Revenue of Pennsylvania

Eliminated in primary
George Halcovage Jr.
Scott Uehlinger, delegate to the 2016 Republican National Convention

Primary results

Democratic primary

Candidates

Nominee
Denny Wolff, former Secretary of Agriculture of Pennsylvania

Eliminated in primary
Laura Quick, delivery driver
Gary Wegman, dentist

Endorsements

Primary results

General election

Endorsements

Polling

Results

District 10

The 10th district was previously in Northeastern Pennsylvania, but it now overlaps with much of the former 4th district in South Central Pennsylvania. Under the map released in 2018, the 10th district includes Harrisburg and a portion of York County. The incumbent from the 4th district is Republican Scott Perry, who has represented his district since 2013. He was re-elected to a third term with 66% of the vote in 2016. Several Democrats sought to challenge Perry in 2018, with George Scott, a 20-year Army veteran and Lutheran pastor, receiving the party's nomination.

Republican primary

Candidates

Nominee
Scott Perry, incumbent U.S. Representative

Primary results

Democratic primary

Candidates

Nominee
George Scott, Lutheran pastor and former Army Lt. Colonel

Eliminated in primary
Shavonnia Corbin-Johnson, former assistant to the director for the Office of Management and Budget
Eric Ding, public health scientist
Alan Howe, Air Force veteran

Withdrawn
Christina Hartman, former nonprofit executive and nominee for Pennsylvania's 16th congressional district in 2016

Primary results

General election

Endorsements

Debates
Complete video of debate, October 18, 2018

Polling

Predictions

Results

District 11

The old 11th district was in Northeastern Pennsylvania, but the district now overlaps with much of the former 16th district in South Central Pennsylvania. The new district consists of Lancaster County and portions of York County. The incumbent from the former 16th district is Republican Lloyd Smucker, who has held office since 2017.

Meteorologist Drew Anderson planned to run without party affiliation and expected to be listed that way on the November ballot. However, he failed to file papers in time, and was not in the race.

Republican primary

Candidates

Nominee
Lloyd Smucker, incumbent U.S. Representative

Primary results

Democratic primary
Christina Hartman, a former nonprofit executive who lost against Smucker in 16th had filed for a rematch, however following the court ordered redrawing she considered switching to run in the more competitive 10th before withdrawing from the race altogether.

Candidates

Nominee
Jess King, nonprofit director

Withdrawn
John George, former Warwick superintendent
Christina Hartman, former nonprofit executive and nominee for this seat in 2016
Charles Klein, pharmacist and candidate for state representative in 2016

Endorsements

Primary results

General election

Endorsements

Polling
{| class="wikitable"
|- valign= bottom
! Poll source
! Date(s)administered
! Samplesize
! Margin oferror
! style="width:100px;"| LloydSmucker (R)
! style="width:100px;"| JessKing (D)
! Other
! Undecided
|-
| Susquehanna Polling and Research
| align=center| October 21–22, 2018
| align=center| 311
| align=center| ± 5.6%
|  align=center| 50%
| align=center| 46%
| align=center| 1%
| align=center| 3%
|-
| Public Policy Polling (D-King)
| align=center| September 12–13, 2018
| align=center| 552
| align=center| ± 4.2%
|  align=center| 44%
| align=center| 35%
| align=center| –
| align=center| 21%

Predictions

Results

District 12

The old 12th district was in Southwestern Pennsylvania, but the new district is in North Central Pennsylvania. It overlaps with the former 10th district, which was represented by Republican Tom Marino. Marino had held office since 2011.

Republican primary

Candidates

Nominee
Tom Marino, incumbent U.S. Representative

Eliminated in primary
Douglas McLinko

Primary results

Democratic primary

Candidates

Nominee
Marc Friedenburg, teacher

Eliminated in primary
Judith Herschel, certified drug & alcohol counselor

Primary results

General election

Endorsements

Results

District 13

The old 13th district was in Southeastern Pennsylvania, but the new district is in Western Pennsylvania. The new district overlaps with much of the old 9th district, which was represented by retiring Republican Congressman Bill Shuster.

Republican primary

Candidates

Nominee
John Joyce, physician

Eliminated in primary
Stephen Bloom, state representative
John Eichelberger, state senator
Art Halvorson, businessman, Coast Guard veteran and candidate for this seat in 2014 & 2016
Benjamin Hornberger, laborer and former marine
Doug Mastriano, retired Army Colonel
Travis Schooley, businessman and candidate for this seat in 2012 & 2014
Bernard Washabaugh II

Declined
Bill Shuster, incumbent U.S. Representative

Primary results

Democratic primary

Candidates

Nominee
Brent Ottaway

Primary results

General election

Endorsements

Polling

Results

District 14

The old 14th district consisted of the city of Pittsburgh and parts of surrounding suburbs, but the new district consists of suburbs to the south and west of Pittsburgh. The district overlaps with much of the former 18th district. The winner of the 2018 special election, Democrat Conor Lamb, ran in the more competitive 17th district.

Democratic primary

Candidates

Nominee
Bibiana Boerio, businesswoman and chief of staff to former Representative Joe Sestak

Eliminated in primary
Tom Prigg
Adam Sedlock, psychologist
Bob Solomon, physician and candidate for this seat in 2018

Declined
Conor Lamb, incumbent U.S. Representative (running in the 17th)

Primary results

Republican primary

Candidates

Nominee
Guy Reschenthaler, state senator and candidate for this seat in 2018

Eliminated in primary
Rick Saccone, state representative and nominee for this seat in 2018

Primary results

General election

Endorsements

Predictions

Results

District 15

The old 15th district was in Eastern Pennsylvania, but the new district is in Western Pennsylvania. The new district overlaps with much of the former 5th district, which is represented by Republican G.T. Thompson. Thompson has held office since 2009.

Republican primary

Candidates

Nominee
G.T. Thompson, incumbent U.S. Representative

Primary results

Democratic primary

Candidates

Nominee
Susan Boser

Eliminated in primary
Wade Jodun

Primary results

General election

Endorsements

Results

District 16

The former 16th district was in Southeastern Pennsylvania, but the redrawn 16th district is in Northwestern Pennsylvania, overlapping with the former 3rd district. The incumbent from the 3rd district was Republican Mike Kelly, who has represented the district since 2011. He was re-elected to a fourth term unopposed in 2016. Kelly had considered running for the U.S. Senate, but announced he would run for re-election instead.

Republican primary

Candidates

Nominee
Mike Kelly, incumbent U.S. Representative

Primary results

Democratic primary

Candidates

Nominee
Ron DiNicola, U.S. Marine Veteran and Erie County Solicitor and nominee for Pennsylvania's 21st congressional district in 1996

Eliminated in primary
Robert Multari
Chris Rieger

Endorsements

Primary results

General election

Endorsements

Debates
Complete video of debate, October 8, 2018

Polling

Predictions

Results

District 17

The former 17th district was in Northeastern Pennsylvania, but the new 17th district consists of suburbs west of Pittsburgh. The district overlaps with parts of the former 12th district, which is represented by Republican Keith Rothfus. Rothfus has held office since 2013, and ran for reelection in the new 17th.

The new map drew the home of Democrat Conor Lamb, who won a special election for the old 18th District, into the new 17th. The 17th is far less Republican than its predecessor, and voted for Democrats downballot, leading to speculation that Lamb would run for a full term in the 17th regardless of the special election result. On March 14, Democratic officials in Beaver County, which is entirely within the 17th, received a written request from Lamb for their endorsement in the 2018 general election. On March 20, Lamb formally filed to run for a full term in the 17th.

Republican primary

Candidates

Nominee
Keith Rothfus, incumbent U.S. Representative

Primary results

Democratic primary

Candidates

Nominee
Conor Lamb, incumbent U.S. Representative

Primary results

General election

Endorsements

Debates
Complete video of debate, October 16, 2018

Polling

Predictions

Results

District 18

The 18th district formerly consisted of the southern suburbs of Pittsburgh, but the new district is now centered on Pittsburgh itself. The district overlaps with the former 14th district, which is represented by Democrat Michael F. Doyle. Doyle has held office since 1995. He ran unopposed in the general election.

Democratic primary

Candidates

Nominee
Michael F. Doyle, incumbent U.S. Representative

Eliminated in primary
Janis C. Brooks, pastor, CEO/founder of Citizens to Abolish Domestic Apartheid and candidate for this seat in 2012, 2014 & 2016

Primary results

General election

Endorsements

Results

See also
 2018 United States House of Representatives elections

References

External links
Candidates at Vote Smart
Candidates at Ballotpedia
Campaign finance at FEC
Campaign finance at OpenSecrets

Official campaign websites of first district candidates
Brian Fitzpatrick (R) for Congress
Scott Wallace (D) for Congress

Official campaign websites of second district candidates
Brendan Boyle (D) for Congress
David Torres (R) for Congress

Official campaign websites of third district candidates
Dwight Evans (D) for Congress
Bryan Leib (R) for Congress

Official campaign websites of fourth district candidates
Dan David (R) for Congress
Madeleine Dean (D) for Congress

Official campaign websites of fifth district candidates
Pearl Kim (R) for Congress
Mary Gay Scanlon (D) for Congress

Official campaign websites of sixth district candidates
Chrissy Houlahan (D) for Congress
Greg McCauley (R) for Congress

Official campaign websites of seventh district candidates
Marty Nothstein (R) for Congress
Tim Silfies (L) for Congress
Susan Wild (D) for Congress

Official campaign websites of eighth district candidates
Matt Cartwright (D) for Congress
John Chrin (R) for Congress

Official campaign websites of ninth district candidates
Dan Meuser (R) for Congress
Denny Wolff (D) for Congress

Official campaign websites of tenth district candidates
Scott Perry (R) for Congress
George Scott (D) for Congress

Official campaign websites of eleventh district candidates
Jess King (D) for Congress
Lloyd Smucker (R) for Congress

Official campaign websites of twelfth district candidates
Marc Friedenberg (D) for Congress
Tom Marino (R) for Congress

Official campaign websites of thirteenth district candidates
John Joyce (R) for Congress
Brent Ottaway (D) for Congress

Official campaign websites of fourteenth district candidates
Bibiana Boerio (D) for Congress
Guy Reschenthaler (R) for Congress

Official campaign websites of fifteenth district candidates
Susan Boser (D) for Congress
G.T. Thompson (R) for Congress

Official campaign websites of sixteenth district candidates
Ron DiNicola (D) for Congress
Mike Kelly (R) for Congress

Official campaign websites of seventeenth district candidates
Conor Lamb (D) for Congress
Keith Rothfus (R) for Congress

Official campaign websites of eighteenth district candidates
Mike Doyle (D) for Congress

2018
Pennsylvania
United States House of Representatives